The textile industry is the largest manufacturing industry in Pakistan. Pakistan is the eighth largest exporter of textile commodities in Asia. Textile sector contributes 8.5% to the GDP of Pakistan. In addition, the sector employs about 45% of the total labor force in the country (and 38% of the manufacturing workers). Pakistan is the fourth largest producer of cotton with the third largest spinning capacity in Asia after China and India and contributes 5% to the global spinning capacity. At present, there are 1,221 ginning units, 442 spinning units, 124 large spinning units and 425 small units which produce textile.

The Government of Pakistan has established a ministry division, Ministry of Textile Industry division, to administer the textile industry.

History
The origin of the Indian textiles is thought to be the Indus Valley civilization, situated in modern Pakistan, where people used homespun cotton to weave garments. Historically, the Indus valley region engaged in significant trade with the rest of the world. The silk from the region, for example, is known to have been popular in Rome, Egypt, Britain, and Indonesia.

Significance 
Textile Sector of Pakistan is the heart and soul of this nation since Independence. It is the largest Manufacturing Industry in Pakistan. Export of $3.5 billion (6.5% of total exported cotton in world) in 2017-2018. Pakistan is the eighth largest exporter of textile commodities in Asia. Contribution in economy is equal to approx. 8.5% of total GDP. Textile Sector employs about 45% of the total Labor force in the country. In the year 2017-18 Exports of textile sector grew by $4.4 billion. Pakistan is also third largest consumer of Cotton in the World. Total Textile mills are 464 in Pakistan out of which five percent are on the PSX. Textile has a total processing capacity of 5.2 billion square meters.  International brands working in Pakistan with local textile mills are namely; H&M, Levis, Nike, Adidas, Puma, Target etc. Textile businesses are concentrated in Karachi with a share of 38% and 28% in Faisalabad. Out of 464, 316 textile units in Punjab, 116 in Sindh. Pakistan's exports are under threat mainly from regional competitors because the governments of these countries support their textile industry a lot as compared to Pakistan's government. Rs.185 million has been approved in Pakistan for the Export Development Fund for the development of the textile sector. The textile industry provides 40% of the bank credit in Pakistan.

In the 1950s, textile manufacturing emerged as a central part of Pakistan's industrialization, shortly following independence from the British rule in the South Asia. In 1974, the Pakistan government established the Cotton Export Corporation of Pakistan (CEC). The CEC served as a barrier to private manufacturers from participating in international trade. However, in the late 1980s, the role of the CEC diminished and by 1988-89, private manufacturers were able to buy cotton from ginners and sell in both domestic and foreign markets. Between 1947 and 2000, the number of textile mills in Pakistan increased from three to six hundred. In the same time period, spindles increased from 177,000 to 805 million.

There are 423 textile industries working in the country. Pakistan has a supply base for almost all man-made and natural yarns and fabrics, including cotton, rayon and others. This abundance of raw material is a big advantage for Pakistan due to its beneficial impact on cost and operational lead time.

Production 
There are six primary sectors of the textile production in Pakistan:
 Spinning
 Weaving 
 Processing
 Printing 
 Garment manufacturing 
 Filament yarn manufacturing
Cotton is the largest segment of textile production. Other fibers produced include synthetic fiber, filament yarn, art silk, wool, and jute.
 Cotton: Cotton spinning is perhaps the most important segment in the Pakistan textile industry with 521 units installed and operational.
 Synthetic fibers: Within synthetic fibers, nylon, polyester, acrylic, and polyolefin dominate the market. There are currently five major producers of synthetic fibers in Pakistan, with a total capacity of 636,000 tons per annum.
 Filament yarn: Three types of filament yarn are produced in Pakistan. These are acetate rayon yarn, polyester filament yarn, and nylon filament yarn. There are currently about six units in the country. 
 Artificial Silk: This fiber resembles silk but costs less to produce. There are about 90,000 looms in the country located mainly in Karachi, Faisalabad, Gujranwala, and Jalapur Jattan, as well as some in FATA.
 Wool: The main products manufactured from wool include woolen yarn, acrylic yarn, fabrics, shawls, blankets, and carpets. 
 Jute: Jute sakes and hessian cloth are primarily used for packing agricultural products such as grain and rice. The production of jute products was approximately 100,000 tons in 2009-10.

Textile Production Technology and Skill Development 
The Textile Institute Manchester, UK's local section for Lahore, Pakistan has played an extensive role in contributing to development of skill improvement and technology sharing through its various training and latest knowledge sharing platforms.

Trade 
Textiles comprise 57% of Pakistan's export revenues. However, in recent years, textile exports have declined significantly. Textile exports were recorded at $11.625 billion in 2014-2015. In 2015-2016, this number had dropped 7.7% to $10.395 billion.

The Pakistan Textile Exporters Association recently requested the government to take significant measures to ensure the growth of textile exports and sustain the employment provided by the sector. Specifically, the PTEA has requested:
 Zero rating on export value chain (i.e. no tax, no refund) to boost export growth
 Subsidize a decrease in cost of production to boost competitiveness of Pakistani exports
 Guarantee energy supply to textile mills at competitive rates
Furthermore, the Pakistan Textile Mills Association has demanded that the removal of duty on cotton imports and a rebate of five percent on textile exports. This plea has come at a time with about 110 mills have been shut down due to various barriers to growth including the energy crisis.

Barriers to growth 
In recent years, Pakistan has faced competition from regional players including Bangladesh, India and Vietnam. In the past decade, Pakistan's share in global textile market decreased to 1.7 percent from 2.2 percent, Bangladesh saw an increase from 1.9 to 3.3 percent and India from 3.4 to 4.7 percent. Barriers to growth include: 
 Cost of production: The rising cost of production in the country has stalled investment as well as export competitiveness. A vertical shift in monetary policy and KIBOR rates have contributed to an increase in the cost of doing business and reduced lending abilities of local manufacturers.
 Energy Crisis: Pakistan is currently facing a large-scale energy crisis. Due to energy demand exceeding supply by about 5000 MW. The government manages the deficit through daily power cuts (or blackouts). These power cuts have significantly impacted manufacturing industries in Pakistan. Several textile mills have closed their units due to inability to sustain operations. In addition, the mills have reportedly turned away export orders due to the inability to fill these orders when power cuts per day can last upwards of 12 hours. 
 Research and Development: There has been a limited effort to improve the quality and quantity of textiles in Pakistan through research and development, limiting the competitiveness of Pakistan's textiles in the global market.

Labor rights 
The textile industry is the second largest employment sector in Pakistan. Labor costs are estimated to be about five to eight percent of total cost while import income of the sector is estimated to be about $12.5 billion in 2010-11. Textile mill owners have often complained that labor costs are "too high" while workers continue to be underpaid and over utilized. Factories often do not issue letters of employments to workers and therefore can easily fire them without legal consequences. Furthermore, safety and security remains a significant issue at textile, where there are limited checks on exhaust systems, light systems, and waste water disposal. This dire state of affairs of labor rights comes in sharp contrast to the growing Pakistan fashion industry, which primary serves the country's elites.

See also
 Economy of Pakistan
 Foreign trade of Pakistan
 Pakistan Textile Journal
 Textile manufacturing

References 

 
Industries of Pakistan